Pennadam (Pen Aavu Kadam) is a panchayat town in Cuddalore district in the Indian state of Tamil Nadu.

Geography
Pennadam has an average elevation of 54 metres (177 feet). Sudarkozhundeeswarar Temple was built in the early Chola period. Pennadam is also the birthplace of Maigandanathar, one of the Nayanmars. A temple was also built for Maigandanathar in this town in the 20th century.

Demographics
 India census, Pennadam had a population of 17,142. Males constitute 51% of the population and females 49%. Pennadam has an average literacy rate of 65%, higher than the national average of 59.5%: male literacy is 73%, and female literacy is 56%. In Pennadam, 11% of the population is under 6 years of age.

References

Cities and towns in Cuddalore district